Below is an incomplete list of Knights Commander of the Royal Guelphic Order, from the creation of the order in 1815 until 1837. A Hanoverian order, appointments have not been conferred by the British monarch (in their role as King of Hanover) since the death of King William IV in 1837, when the personal union of the United Kingdom and Hanover ended. After 1837 the order continued to be conferred by the Kingdom of Hanover, until the Kingdom was dissolved by Prussia in 1866. After this it became an order of the Royal House of Hanover.

List of Knights Commander of the Royal Guelphic Order

See also
Royal Guelphic Order
List of Knights Grand Cross of the Royal Guelphic Order

Sources
The Gentleman's Magazine
Shaw, William Arthur 

Guelphic
Lower Saxony-related lists
Orders, decorations, and medals of Hanover
Lists of British award winners
Lists of German award winners